Nepal Chautari is a topical live show and analysis of Nepal's transitional issues with guest speakers such as political and civil society leaders, opinion-makers, and national planners. The nationwide public participation through a toll-free phone is 1660-01-34567.

Similarly, the audiences can ask the queries and give their opinions through SMS (For SMS: Type NC Your Message and Send to 5500)and their fan page on Facebook.

About Nepal Chautari

Nepal Chautari is a radio media bridge between responsible community figures determining the future of Nepal and the common Nepali citizens. The calling listeners share their understanding of issues discussed, their opinions, and solutions to elected and representative government officers, political and civil society leaders, opinion-makers, and national planners present in person at Antenna's Studio in Bakhundole Lalitpur. As the discussion lives between the host and the guest, listeners are invited to dial the toll-free number from their local telephone sets or public telephone booths (PCOs) and voice their opinions.

Global Nepali communities and people interested in Nepal's socio-political issues can equally participate. At present international callers to Nepal must bear the calling cost on their own.

Nepal Chautari is transmitted live through 58 FM Radio Stations across Nepal using the Ujyalo Satellite Channel of Communication Corner and CIN Channel. It marks both the practical approach and a symbolic step of the arrival of the latest technology and openness of media communications in Nepal.

Nepal Chautari was first aired in January 2007 and was broadcast seven days a week from 8:10 am to 9:00 am until June 2009, with an average participation of 125 callers, of whom 20 callers were live on air. USAID/Nepal supported the program initially for the first 18 months. Currently, National Endowment for Democracy (NED)is financially supporting the program.

Since July 2009, Nepal Chautari, is being presented to its listeners in a modified format. The former 7 -days a week talk show is now being aired on Fridays, Saturdays, and Sundays every week from 8:10 - 9:00 am. While the Friday talk show continues the earlier format, the Saturday version is a radio magazine that includes radio features and reports from across Nepal. On Sundays, the talk show format continues, whereby the focus will be on justice, and security sector-related issues.

References

External links
Official website
Facebook fan page

Talk radio programs
Nepalese radio programs
2007 radio programme debuts